Clan Aiton is a Scottish clan that is recognized as such by the Lord Lyon King of Arms. However, as the clan does not currently have a chief recognized by the Court of the Lord Lyon, it is therefore considered an armigerous clan.

Clan profile
 Motto: Decerptae Dabunt Odorum (Roses plucked will give sweet smell)
 Crest: A hand pulling a rose, Proper

References
Way, George and Squire, Romily (1994). Collins Scottish Clan & Family Encyclopedia. HarperCollins Publishers.

Scottish clans
Armigerous clans